Traces of Love is a 2006 South Korean romantic drama film directed by Kim Dae-seung, and starring Yoo Ji-tae, Kim Ji-soo, and Uhm Ji-won. The film is based on the Sampoong Department Store collapse, which took place in 1995.

Plot
Law student Choi Hyun-woo and television director Seo Min-joo are a young couple in love, and engaged to be married. Tragedy strikes, however, and Min-joo is killed in the Sampoong Department Store collapse. Several years later, Hyun-woo is given a journal that was written by his former fiancée, which details the journey they would have taken on their honeymoon. Hyun-woo sets out to visit the various places described in the journal, but on his travels he meets another woman, Yoon Se-jin, and discovers that their meeting is more than just coincidence.

Cast
 Yoo Ji-tae as Choi Hyun-woo 
 Kim Ji-soo as Seo Min-joo 
 Uhm Ji-won as Yoon Se-jin 
 Choi Jong-won as Min-joo's father
 Park Seung-tae as Min-joo's mother
 Park Chul-min as Detective Park
 Jung In-gi as prosecutor
 Kim Ki-cheon as real estate man
 Im Jong-yoon as chief prosecutor

Awards and nominations
2006 Blue Dragon Film Awards
 Nomination – Best Supporting Actress – Uhm Ji-won
 Nomination – Best Art Direction – Ha Sang-ho

2007 Chunsa Film Art Awards
 Best Supporting Actress – Uhm Ji-won
 Best Screenplay – Jang Min-seok

2007 Grand Bell Awards
  Nomination – Best Lighting – Choi Seok-jae

Remake
Beijing Hairun Pictures is set to make a Chinese remake in 2016, co-produced with Korean company Dhuta Co. Ltd. Victoria Hon, deputy president of Hairun Pictures said, "Traces of Love has an enormous potential to be loved by the Chinese audience. Chinese people love the kind of films that heal the spiritual wound and give the courage to fall in love one more time. Traces of Love does this job in a very special way, which is why we have decided to remake this work."

References

External links 

 
 
 
 

2006 films
2006 drama films
South Korean romantic drama films
South Korean road movies
2000s road movies
Films set in 1995
Films set in 2005
Films set in Seoul
Films directed by Kim Dae-seung
2000s Korean-language films
2000s South Korean films